Klöverträsk is a locality situated in Luleå Municipality, Norrbotten County, Sweden with 246 inhabitants in 2010.

References 

Populated places in Luleå Municipality
Norrbotten